The Sunnmøre Fotballkrets (Sunnmøre Football Association) is one of the 18 district organisations of the Norwegian Football Federation. It administers lower tier football in the traditional district of Sunnmøre.

Background 
Sunnmøre Fotballkrets is the governing body for football in the traditional district of Sunnmøre, which is a part of Møre og Romsdal county. The Association currently has 66 member clubs. Based in Ålesund, the Association's chairman is Lena Charlotte Pedersen.

Affiliated Members 
The following 66 clubs are affiliated to the Sunnmøre Fotballkrets:

Aafk Fortuna
Aalesunds FK
Åheim IL
Aksla IL
Ålesund Døves AK
Åmdal IL
Bergsøy IL
Blindheim IL
Brandal IL
Brattvåg IL
Dalsfjorden FK
Ellingsøy IL
Emblem IL
Fiskerstrand IL
Fjørtoft TIL
Flø IL
Folkestad IL
Giske IL
Gjerdsvika IL
Godøy IL
SK Guard
Gursken IL
Gurskøy IL
Haddal IL
Haramsøy/Nordøy FK
Hareid IL
Harøy IL
Hasundgot IL
SK Herd
Hjørungavåg IL
IL Hødd
Hovdebygda IL
Hundeidvik IL
Kvamsøy IL
Langevåg IL
Larsnes IL
Larsnes/Gursken FK
Lepsøy IL
Moltustranda IL
Mork IL
MSIL
IL Norborg
Norddal/Eidsdal/Geiranger FK
Ørskog IL
Ørsta IL
IL Ravn
SK Rollon
Sæbø IL
Sandsøy IL
SIF/Hessa IL
Skodje IL
Spjelkavik IL
Stordal IL
Stranda IL
Sunnylven IL
FK Sykkylven
Sykkylven IL
Tjørvåg IL
IL Valder
Valldal IL
Vanylven FK
Vartdal TIL
Velledalen og Ringen FL
Vigra IL
Volda Student IL
Volda TI

League competitions 
Sunnmøre Fotballkrets run the following league competitions:

Men's football
4. divisjon  -  one section
5. divisjon  -  one section
6. divisjon  -  three sections

Women's football
2. divisjon  -  one section (section 5 with Trøndelag Fotballkrets) 
3. divisjon  -  one section

Footnotes

External links 

Sunnmøre
Sport in Møre og Romsdal